Samsung Galaxy R Style is an Android smartphone developed by Samsung Electronics. The phone was released in May 2012 and has since been discontinued. It ran on Android 4.0.3 "Ice Cream Sandwich", had a 4.3 inch display, and a 2000 mAh battery.

Specifications

Software
Samsung Galaxy R Style came with Android 4.0.3 "Ice Cream Sandwich", but could later be upgraded to 4.1.2 "Jelly Bean".

Hardware
Samsung Galaxy R Style has a 4.3 inch display. The rear and front facing cameras are 5 and 1.3 MP, respectively. It comes with a Dual-core 1.5 GHz Krait CPU and an Adreno GPU. It has a removable 2000 mAh Lithium-ion battery. Internal storage for the device was 16 GB, and could be expanded via microSD, providing up to an additional 32 GB of storage. It also had 1 GB of RAM.

History
Samsung Galaxy R Style was announced in early 2012 and released on 31st of the same year in South Korea. It has since been discontinued.

See also 
 Samsung Galaxy

References 

Samsung Galaxy
Mobile phones introduced in 2011
Android (operating system) devices
Samsung mobile phones